Vaasan Palloseura (or VPS) is a Finnish football club, based in Vaasa. It currently plays in the first tier of Finnish football (Veikkausliiga). The club's current manager is Jussi Nuorela. The club plays its home matches at Hietalahti. VPS played twice in the UEFA Cup in 1998–99 and in 1999–00, but were knocked out in the 2nd Qualifying Round by Grazer AK of Austria and in the 1st Qualifying Round by St Johnstone of Scotland.

In spring of 2015 it was announced that the construction of VPS's new stadium would start soon. The construction of the new stadium began in the summer of 2015 and was completed in August 2016.

Achievements 

Mestaruussarja/Veikkausliiga:
Winners (2): 1945, 1948
Runners-up (5): 1932, 1940–41, 1949, 1997, 1998
3rd placed (2): 1938, 2013

Ykkönen:
Winners (1): 2021

Finnish Cup:
Runners-up (1): 1972

Finnish League Cup:
Winners (2): 1999, 2000
Runners-up (2): 1997, 2014

European campaigns

Season to season 

56 seasons in Veikkausliiga
20 seasons in Ykkönen
12 seasons in Kakkonen
1 season in Kolmonen

Current squad

Management and boardroom

Management
As of 9 November 2021

Boardroom
As of 24 September 2020

Managers 

 Nuutti Lintamo (1945–46)
 Heikki Kultti (1945–48)
 Géza Toldi (1948–49)
 Tauno Koistinen (1950)
 Jussi Sillanpää (1951)
 Tauno Koistinen (1952–53)
 Martti Häyhä (1954–58)
 Ole Stolpe (1959)
 Erkki Riihimäki (1960–62)
 Niilo Kinnunen (1963)
 Jussi Sillanpää (1964–68)
 Jovan Jevtić (1969–70)
 Kari Dahlsten (1970–72)
 Raimo Hudd (1973)
 Eero Tuhkanen (1974–77)
 Pekka Mäkelä (1978)
 Erkki Myllyaho (1979)
 Esa Virta (1980–82)
 Raimo Hudd (1983)
 Jarmo Meltoranta (1984)
 Jerzy Wojtowicz (1985–87)
 Jarmo Meltoranta (1988–89)
 Markku Myötänen (1989–90)
 Boguslaw Hajdas (1991–92)
 Jerzy Wojtowicz (1993)
 Bogusław Hajdas (1993–95)
 Tomasz Arceusz (1995)
 Heikki Suhonen (1995)
 Hannu Touru (1996–98)
 Sören Cratz (1999)
 Kimmo Lipponen (1999)
 Jukka Ikäläinen (2000–01)
 Keijo Paananen (2002)
 Stephen Ward (2003–04)
 Jari Pyykölä (Jan 1, 2006 – June 9, 2007)
 Mika Koivumäki (2007)
 Janne Lindberg (June 18, 2007 – Dec 31, 2007)
 Tomi Kärkkäinen (Jan 1, 2008 – May 15, 2009)
 Petri Vuorinen (Jan 1, 2009 – May 15, 2009)
 Tommi Pikkarainen (2010–11)
 Petri Vuorinen (Jan 10, 2011 – July 28, 2011)
 Olli Huttunen (Jan 1, 2012 – Jun 29, 2015)
 Petri Vuorinen (Jun 29, 2015 – Jul 8, 2019)
 Christian Sund (Jul 8, 2019 – Dec 31, 2020)
 Jukka Karjalainen (Jan 1, 2021 – Jun 17, 2021)
 Jussi Nuorela (Jun 18, 2021–)

References

External links 

Official website 

 
Football clubs in Finland
Association football clubs established in 1924
Sport in Vaasa
1924 establishments in Finland